Miconia zamorensis is a species of plant in the family Melastomataceae. It is endemic to Ecuador.  Its natural habitat is subtropical or tropical moist montane forests. It is threatened by habitat loss.

References

zamorensis
Endemic flora of Ecuador
Vulnerable flora of South America
Taxonomy articles created by Polbot